Dendrortyx is a bird genus in the family Odontophoridae. It contains the following species:
 Bearded wood partridge (Dendrortyx barbatus)
 Buffy-crowned wood partridge (Dendrortyx leucophrys)
 Long-tailed wood partridge (Dendrortyx macroura)

References

 
Bird genera
 
Taxonomy articles created by Polbot